Elections for London Borough of Hackney Council were held on Thursday 4 May 2006. The whole council was up for election. Hackney is divided into 19 wards, each electing three councillors, so a total of 57 seats were up for election.

Election results

Election for Mayor
In a system with second preference being also decided by the Electorate, the Mayor was comfortably re-elected with a majority of over 15,000.

Results for each candidate

¹Under the Supplementary Vote system, if no candidate receives 50% of 1st choice votes, 2nd choice votes are added to the result for the top two 1st choice candidates. If a ballot gives a first and second preference to the top two candidates in either order, then their second preference is not counted, so that a second preference cannot count against a first.

²Percentage figures are not officially used on the final votes, they are produced here for illustration and are calculated by the candidates final vote divided by the total of final votes.

Turnout for the Election of Mayor: 34.3% (26.34% in the previous election in 2002)

Mayor Jules Pipe's response to re-election

Ward results

Brownswood

Cazenove

Chatham

Clissold

Dalston

De Beauvoir

Hackney Central

Hackney Downs

Haggerston

Hoxton

King's Park

Leabridge

Lordship

New River

Queensbridge

Springfield

Stoke Newington Central

Victoria

Wick

See also
2006 United Kingdom local elections

References

External links
Hackney local council results

Council elections in the London Borough of Hackney
2006 London Borough council elections